Kanakapura Lok Sabha constituency was a former Lok Sabha constituency in Karnataka state in southern India. It included eight Assembly constituencies, namely Kanakapura, Ramanagaram, Channapatna, Magadi, Sathanur, Uttarahalli, Malavalli and Anekal. Out of them, Kanakapura, Ramanagaram, Channapatna, Magadi and Anekal assembly segments were retained in the Bangalore Rural constituency created in 2008 as part of delimitation in Karnataka. Sathanur segment was merged between Kanakapura, Ramanagaram and Channapatna constituencies. Malavalli became a part of Mandya constituency and Uttarahalli was reformed and Uttarahalli Circle was merged with new Bangalore South Assembly Constituency.

The new Assembly Constituencies Bangalore South, Anekal, and Rajarajeshwarinagar became a part of Bangalore Rural along with Kunigal Assembly Constituency from Tumkur district

Members of Parliament

1952-66: Constituency does not exist
 From Kanakapur constituency in Mysore State:
 1967: M. V. Rajasekharan, Indian National Congress
 1971: C. K. Jaffer Sheriff, Indian National Congress
 Karnataka State:
 1977: M. V. Chandrashekara Murthy, Indian National Congress
 1980: M. V. Chandrashekara Murthy, Indian National Congress (Indira)
 1984: M. V. Chandrashekara Murthy, Indian National Congress
 1989: M. V. Chandrashekara Murthy, Indian National Congress
 1991: M. V. Chandrashekara Murthy, Indian National Congress
 1996: H. D. Kumaraswamy, Janata Dal
 1998: M. Srinivas, Bharatiya Janata Party
 1999: M. V. Chandrashekara Murthy, Indian National Congress
 2002  (By-Elections): H. D. Deve Gowda, Janata Dal (Secular)
 2004: Tejashwini Sreeramesh, Indian National Congress
 2008 Onwards: Constituency does not exist

See Bangalore Rural Lok Sabha constituency

Election results 

1996 Lok Sabha
H D Kumaraswamy (Janatha Dal) - winner

1998 Lok Sabha
M.Srinivas (BJP)                 :  470,387  
Dr. D. Premachandra Sagar (INC)  :  453,946 
H D Kumaraswamy (Janatha Dal) : came third  

1999 Lok Sabha
M.V.Chandrashekara Murthy (INC) : 532,910 
M. Srinivas (BJP) :  498,893

 2002 Lok Sabha (by-poll).
H. D. Devegowda (Janata Dal Secular): 5,81,709 
D. K. Shivakumar (Congress)  :  5,29,133 
K. S. Eshwarappa (BJP)  : 	2,28,134 	

 2004 Lok Sabha.
Tejaswini Ramesh (a.k.a. Tejaswini Gowda), Congress : 584,238 
Ramachandra Gowda (BJP) :  467,575 
Deve Gowda (JD(S)) :  The former PM came third.

 The constituency ceased to exist in 2008 when seats were re-arranged as per the latest population spread.
 Results in tabular form

See also
 Bangalore Rural Lok Sabha constituency
 List of former constituencies of the Lok Sabha

References

Former constituencies of the Lok Sabha
2008 disestablishments in India
Constituencies disestablished in 2008
Former Lok Sabha constituencies of Karnataka